Highland Brigade is the name of several military units:

 Highland Brigade (United Kingdom), a historical unit of the British Army, which has been formed a number of times
 Polish Independent Highland Brigade, a Polish military unit created in France in 1939, after the fall of Poland